Boynton may refer to:

People
 Boynton (surname)

Places

In the United States
 Boynton Township, Tazewell County, Illinois
 Boynton, Georgia, an unincorporated community
 Boynton, Missouri, an unincorporated community
 Boynton, Oklahoma, a town
 Boynton, a neighborhood of Detroit

In the United Kingdom
 Boynton, East Riding of Yorkshire, England, a village and civil parish

Other uses
Boynton baronets, in the Baronetage of England
Boynton School, now named Schoolhouse Children's Museum & Learning Center, Boynton Beach, Florida, on the National Register of Historic Places

See also
 Boynton Beach, Florida
 Boynton Inlet
 John Bayton, a Hambledon cricketer whose surname was occasionally spelled Boynton
 Boyington